Paul Greenberg (born July 4, 1967) is an American fisherman and author who focuses on environmental, seafood and technology issues.

Biography

Greenberg has been a lifelong fisherman and started fishing with his father when he was five years old.

His book,  Four Fish: The Future of the Last Wild Food, was published in 2010 by Penguin Press on July 15, and entered the New York Times Best Selling Hard Cover List as of August 13.  In addition to its commercial success the book received wide critical acclaim, most notably on the cover of the New York Times Book Review by the Times' food editor Sam Sifton who called it "a necessary book for anyone truly interested in what we take from the sea to eat." The book won the 2011 James Beard Award for writing and literature. Many of the themes in Four Fish were later explored in a 2017 Frontline PBS documentary Greenberg anchored and co-wrote called The Fish On My Plate. Greenberg's 2015 TED Talk has received over 1.5 million views.

In 2014 Greenberg followed up Four Fish with American Catch: The Fight for Our Local Seafood, a book that examined the odd fact that while the US controls more ocean than any country on earth it imports more than 91% of its seafood from other countries. In 2018 Penguin Press published the third in his "marine trilogy" The Omega Principle: Seafood and the Quest for a Longer Life and a Healthier Planet an in-depth look at omega-3 fatty acids and the unique role they play in human health and environmental balance. In 2020 and 2021 Greenberg published Goodbye Phone, Hello World  (Chronicle Books) and The Climate Diet  (Penguin Press). The Climate Diet focuses on 50 ways people can reduce their carbon footprint. 

Greenberg has been a National Endowment for the Arts Literature Fellow, a Pew Fellow in Marine Conservation, and a W.K. Kellogg Foundation Food and Society Policy Fellow. He currently resides in New York City and lectures widely throughout North America.

Diet

In September 2015 in response to having his blood drawn, Greenberg decided to become a pescetarian. Greenberg spent a year eating only fish.

Selected publications

 Four Fish (2010)
 American Catch (2014)
 The Omega Principle (2018)
 Goodbye Phone, Hello World (2020)
 The Climate Diet (2021)

References

External links
Paul Greenberg interviewed on Fresh Air
New York Times Magazine review of "Four Fish"
Paul Greenberg
Penguin Random House Speakers Bureau

1967 births
21st-century American non-fiction writers
American environmentalists
American fishers
American food writers
American male journalists
American male writers
American non-fiction environmental writers
Journalists from New York City
Living people
Writers from New York City